Centennial is a novel by American author James A. Michener, published in 1974. It traces the history of the plains of north-east Colorado from prehistory until the mid-1970s. Geographic details about the fictional town of Centennial and its surroundings indicate that the region is in modern Weld County.

Centennial was made into a popular twelve-part television miniseries, also titled  Centennial, that was broadcast on NBC from October 1978 through February 1979 and was filmed in several parts of Colorado. NBC Universal released a six volume DVD set in 2008.

Overview 
Michener lived in Greeley during the late 1930s and was familiar with the area. He used a variety of source material for his fictional town taken from various areas in eastern Colorado, and Centennial is not meant to represent a single settlement. His description of the town's location places it at the junction of the South Platte River and the Cache la Poudre River. There is a city called Centennial, Colorado, but it did not exist until 2001 and its location and history are not like the town described in either the book or miniseries.

Many episodes in the book are loosely based on events in eastern Colorado and south-east Wyoming, which for novelistic reasons are brought to one locale. For example, "The Massacre" is based on the Sand Creek Massacre which took place in Kiowa County, Colorado, in 1864. Other parts of the book are loosely based on a family from Sterling in Logan County. In explaining fact from fiction, Michener states in the text that:

This is a novel. Its characters and scenes are imaginary. There was no Venneford Ranch, no prairie town of Line Camp, no Skimmerhorn cattle drive of 1868, no Centennial. None of the families depicted here were real, nor founded upon real precedents. There was no Lame Beaver, nor Skimmerhorn nor Zendt nor Grebe. On the other hand, certain background incidents and characters are real. There was a great convocation in 1851 at Fort Laramie. There was a drought in 1931–5. Jennie Jerome, the mother of Winston Churchill, did frequent the English ranches near Cheyenne. Charles Goodnight, one of the great men of the west, did haul the corpse of his partner home in a lead box. Melchior Fordney, the master gunsmith, was murdered. The South Platte River did behave as described.

Chapters 
 "The Commission": The fictional preface for the book.
 "The Land": The formation of the Earth, specifically the Rockies and the land directly around Centennial.
 "The Inhabitants": A series of stories about animals that supposedly lived near what would become Centennial, from the dinosaur Diplodocus to the arrival of man.
 "The Many Coups of Lame Beaver": A biography of Lame Beaver, an Arapaho Native American.
 "The Yellow Apron": The lives of the beaver trappers Pasquinel and Alexander McKeag.
 "The Wagon and the Elephant": Describes Levi Zendt's journey out of Pennsylvania in search of a new life in Oregon.
 "The Massacre": Frank Skimmerhorn leads the militia to massacre a group of Arapaho.
 "The Cowboys": Chronicles a cattle drive from Texas to Centennial and the establishment of the Venneford Ranch.
 "The Hunters": Describes three separate Buffalo hunts which led to the near extermination of the Buffalo in the west.
 "A Smell of Sheep": The arrival of sheepmen in Colorado and the fights between them and the cattlemen.
 "The Crime": Describes the arrival of the Wendell family in Centennial and the crime that they commit.
 "Central Beet": Describes the establishment of the sugar beet industry and the arrival of Chicanos to Centennial.
 "Drylands": The arrival of dryland farming to Colorado from the perspective of the Grebe family.
 "November Elegy": A snapshot of the life of Paul Garrett, a descendant of many of the characters from previous chapters.

Characters
Most of the primary characters of the novel are represented in the ancestry of Paul Garrett as follows:

References

External links
 James Michener's Greeley, Jefferson, and Centennial

1974 American novels
American historical novels
American novels adapted into television shows
Books about Native Americans
Novels by James A. Michener
Novels set in Colorado
Random House books
Weld County, Colorado